The Kumagai Gumi Bruins were a Japanese basketball team that played in the Japan Basketball League. They were based in Tokyo.

Notable players
Toshihiro Goto
Moses Scurry
Harvest Smith

Coaches
Osamu Kuraishi

References

Defunct basketball teams in Japan
Sports teams in Tokyo
Basketball teams established in 1952
Basketball teams disestablished in 1994
1952 establishments in Japan
1994 disestablishments in Japan